

The Farman F.160 was a heavy bomber aircraft developed in France in the late 1920s. It was essentially an attempt by Farman Aviation Works to modernise its tremendously successful F.60 Goliath design of the immediately postwar years. The most noticeable external difference was the larger tailfin of the new aircraft. Like its predecessor, it was a large three-bay biplane of conventional configuration with unstaggered wings of equal span. Initially conceived as a heavy night bomber, most examples built were float-equipped torpedo bombers for the Aéronautique Maritime, which operated some 40 of the F.165 variant and 200 of the F.168. One of the original F.160 night bombers was exported to Italy, and one to Japan. Plans to develop airliner versions did not progress past the prototype stage.

Variants
F.160 Four-seat night bomber with two  Farman 12We engines, designated F.160 BN.4 by Aviation Militaire.
F.161 One airliner with 2x  Gnome-Rhône 9Akx engines and one bomber similar to the F.160, powered by 2x  Farman 12Wers engines.
F.162 One prototype airliner with 2x  Gnome-Rhône 9Akx engines.
F.163 Airliner with 2x  Gnome-Rhône 9Aa engines.
F.165 Seaplane torpedo bomber with 2x Gnome-Rhône 9A  or 9Aa engines.
F.166 2x  Salmson 9Ab engines.
F.167 Seaplane torpedo bomber with 2x  Gnome-Rhône 9Aa engines.
F.168 Seaplane torpedo bomber with Gnome-Rhône 9Akx engines; main production version, 200 built.
F.169 Improved airliner version with Gnome-Rhône 9Akx engines.
F.268 One F.168 fitted with 2x supercharged  Salmson 18 Abs engines.
F.269 One F.169 fitted with floats and modified wings as a sesquiplane seaplane.
F.368 One F.168 re-engined with 2x  Gnome-Rhône 9Kbrs engines.

Operators

French Navy

one aircraft only.

One aircraft only.

Royal Romanian Air Force

Specifications (F.168)

References

External links

 

1920s French bomber aircraft
F.0160